Camilo Sobreira de Santana (born 3 June 1968) is a Brazilian agricultural engineer and politician, affiliated to the Workers' Party (PT). He has a bachelor's degree in 
agricultural engineering from the Federal University of Ceará and a master's degree in Development and Environment from the same university. As an undergraduate, he held the director function UFC Students of Central Directory. He was Secretary of Agrarian Development of the State of Ceará  in the government of Cid Gomes, from 1 February 2007 to 31 December 2010, as well as Secretary of Cities in the same government.

He was voted the most voted state deputy of Ceará in October 2010, with 131,171 votes. He was governor of the state of Ceará until 2 April 2022, when he resigned in order to run for Federal Senate.

Election to the government

Santana's candidature for the government of Ceará was made official on 29 June in Fortaleza, during collective agreement of PROS, PT and other parties allied with the coalition led by the governor Cid Gomes.  The convention was marked, however, by uncertainty about the indications to Senator and Vice-Governor of the coalition. Santana had previously been considered for the top post of the state executive, but did not include the list of favorites for the position, dominated by PROS members.

Santana was elected governor of Ceará on 26 October 2014. His victory was given as mathematically certain even before the official confirmation by the Superior Electoral Court.

Political future 
Santana, a member of the Workers' Party, chose to endorse Ciro Gomes (PDT), himself a former Governor of Ceará, over Fernando Haddad, a fellow member of his party, in the 2018 Brazilian presidential election.

References

External links
Official website (in Portuguese)

Governors of Ceará
People from Crato, Ceará
1968 births
Living people
Brazilian engineers
Workers' Party (Brazil) politicians
Members of the Legislative Assembly of Ceará
21st-century Brazilian politicians
Federal University of Ceará alumni